Joseph "Joe" T. Anderson (1928 – 20 December 2014), also known by the nickname of 'Ginger', was an English professional rugby league footballer who played in the 1940s, 1950s and 1960s.

Background
Joe Anderson was born in Monk Fryston, and his birth was registered in Tadcaster district, West Riding of Yorkshire, England, he founded JT Anderson Transport Ltd of Gateforth, Selby, he died aged 86 of kidney cancer, his funeral service took place at Holy Cross Church, Fryston Road, Airedale, Castleford, at 2 pm on Thursday 8 January 2015, with a committal at Pontefract Crematorium, Wakefield Road, Pontefract at 2.45 pm, followed by a reception at The Carleton Hotel, Pontefract.

Playing career

County honours
Joe Anderson won caps playing left-, i.e. number 8, for Yorkshire while at Castleford in the 16–8 victory over Lancashire at Hull FC's stadium on 28 April 1953, the 16–7 victory over Cumberland at Hull FC's stadium on 5 October 1953, and the 10–18 defeat by Lancashire at Leigh's stadium on 14 October 1953.

Challenge Cup Final appearances
Joe Anderson played left-, i.e. number 8, in Leeds' 9–7 victory over Barrow in the 1956–57 Challenge Cup Final during the 1956–57 season at Wembley Stadium, London on Saturday 11 May 1957, in front of a crowd of 76,318.

County Cup Final appearances
Joe Anderson  played left-, i.e. number 8, in Featherstone Rovers' 15–14 victory over Hull F.C. in the 1959–60 Yorkshire County Cup Final during the 1959–60 season at Headingley Rugby Stadium, Leeds on Saturday 31 October 1959.

Club career
Joe Anderson was transferred from Castleford to Leeds on Monday 10 January 1955 for £1700 (based on increases in average earnings, this would be approximately £96,810 in 2013), plus Alan Horsfall in part-exchange, he made his début for Leeds against Featherstone Rovers at Headingley Rugby Stadium, Leeds on Saturday 15 January 1955, he was transferred from Leeds to Featherstone Rovers during 1958, he made his début for Featherstone Rovers on Wednesday 20 August 1958, and he played his last match for Featherstone Rovers during the 1960–61 season.

Genealogical information
Joe Anderson's marriage to Marjorie (née Turton) was registered during third ¼ 1954 in Pontefract district. They had children; Beverley J. Anderson (birth registered fourth ¼  in Leeds district).

References

External links

Search for "Anderson" at rugbyleagueproject.org
Rugby League Final 1957 at britishpathe.com
Anderson, Barker, Barraclough, Smith
RIP Neil James & Joe Anderson

Joseph Anderson Memory Box Search at archive.castigersheritage.com
Joe Anderson Memory Box Search at archive.castigersheritage.com

1928 births
2014 deaths
Castleford Tigers players
English rugby league players
Featherstone Rovers players
Leeds Rhinos players
People from Selby
Rugby league players from Yorkshire
Rugby league props
Yorkshire rugby league team players